Float (stylized in all caps) is the fifth studio album by American rapper K Camp. It was released on August 13, 2021, through RARE Sound, Interscope Records and Empire Distribution. The album features guest appearances from PnB Rock, Trey Songz, Mooski, True Story Gee and Kaleem Taylor. The production on the album was handled by several producers, including OG Parker, Section 8, Bobby Kritical, Natra Average, Nash B and Eric Billingsly, among others.

The album Float was supported by three singles: "Life Has Changed" featuring PnB Rock, "Game Ain't Free", and "Guts" featuring True Story Gee. On August 28, 2021, the album debuted at number 122 on the US Billboard 200 chart in its first week.

Singles 
The album's first and lead single, "Life Has Changed" featuring American rapper and singer PnB Rock, was released on April 16, 2021, as well as an accompanying music video. The song was produced by Bobby Kritical, Koast and New Lane Ant. The song samples Ginuwine's "Differences".

The second single for the album, "Game Ain't Free", was released on June 11, 2021, with an accompanying music video. The song was produced by OG Parker, G. Ry and Bench.

The album's third and final single for the album, "Guts" featuring American rapper True Story Gee, was released on July 23, 2021. The song was produced by Section 8 and Noah Pettigrew.

Track listing 
Credits adapted from Tidal and Genius.

Notes 

  signifies an uncredited producer
  signifies an additional producer

Sample credits 

 "Life Has Changed" contains samples and was interpolated from "Differences", written by Elgin Lumpkin and Troy Oliver, as performed by Ginuwine.

Personnel 
Credits were adapted from Tidal.

Vocalists 
 K Camp – primary artist
 PnB Rock – featured artist (track 7)
 Trey Songz – featured artist (track 8)
 Mooski – featured artist (track 9)
 True Story Gee – featured artist (track 12)
 Kaleem Taylor – featured artist (track 15)

Production 
 Eric Billingsly – producer (track 1, 14)
 Ebon – uncredited producer (track 1)
 Bobby Kritical – producer (tracks 2, 3, 6, 7, 9, 11, 13)
 Omar Guetfa – producer (track 2)
 A.D. – producer (track 2)
 Vntg Jag – producer (tracks 3, 11, 13)
 OG Parker – producer (track 4)
 G. Ry – producer (track 4)
 Camden Bench – additional producer (track 4)
 Section 8 – producer (tracks 5, 12)
 Natra Average – producer (tracks 6, 10, 15)
 TK – producer (tracks 6, 11)
 Koast – producer (track 7)
 New Lane Ant – producer (track 7)
 Nash B – producer (track 8)
 1st Class – producer (track 9)
 YouGotMajor – uncredited producer (track 9)
 Brandon Black – producer (track 11)
 Kreative Villians – uncredited producer (track 11)
 Deontrez McClusky – uncredited producer (track 11)
 Noah Pettigrew – producer (track 12)
 Dylan Graham – uncredited producer (track 14)
 John Conception – uncredited producer (track 14)

Technical 
 Travis Louis – assistant mastering engineer, studio personnel (tracks 1-6, 8-15)
 Bill Jabr – mastering engineer, studio personnel (tracks 1-6)
 Jarrod "JRod" Doyle – mixer, recording engineer, studio personnel (all tracks)
 K Camp – recording engineer, studio personnel (tracks 1-6, 8-15)

Charts

References 

Albums produced by OG Parker
K Camp albums
2021 albums
Interscope Records albums
Empire Distribution albums